Roxanne Micallef (born 11 April 1997) is a Maltese footballer who plays as a midfielder for the Malta women's national team.

Career
She made her debut for the Malta national team on 27 February 2019 against Estonia, coming on as a substitute for Shona Zammit.

References

1997 births
Living people
Women's association football midfielders
Maltese women's footballers
Malta women's international footballers